Jerusha may refer to:

Jerusha, minor Old Testament figure
Jerusha Bingham Kirkland (1743-1788), American missionary
Jerusha Davidson Richardson (1864-1938), British philanthropist and author
Jerusha Hess (born 1980), American filmmaker
Jerusha Jhirad (1891-1984), Indian physician